James Susumu Ishida (born July 29, 1943) is a Japanese-American character actor who has had a role in various projects over the course of his over 30 years-long career in films and television.

Jim Ishida portrayed T. Fujitsu, Marty McFly's boss in 2015 in Back to the Future Part II in 1989, and his most recent role was in 2005, when he had a part in the television movie Reading Room. He has had guest parts in such TV shows as Nurses (1992), Baywatch (1992), Knots Landing (1989), The A-Team (1986), Trapper John, M.D. (1984), and The Rockford Files (1977). Ishida got his start in television in appearances on the hit CBS-TV show Hawaii Five-O, appearing in three episodes in different parts from 1973 to 1975. Ishida also appeared in a part as a Bali Majestic Guest in the Ken Kwapis directed film Dunston Checks In in 1996.

Early life and family

Born the son of James Takeshi Ishida (May 19, 1917?) and the late Sachiko "Sue" Ishida (May 31, 1920August 25, 2010). Ishida, who was also raised in the nearby town of Lodi, California, and his family were internees at a Japanese American internment camp in Rohwer, Arkansas for about a year during World War II, then released shortly after the conflict ended in 1945. Ishida's mother Sue served for many years in the Lodi Unified School District as a teacher, librarian, and culminating and as the Coordinator of the Instructional Materials Center there in 1982.

Filmography

References

External links

American male film actors
American male stage actors
American male television actors
American film actors of Asian descent
1943 births
People from Lodi, California
People from Stockton, California
Living people
Japanese-American internees
American male actors of Japanese descent